Anito: Defend a Land Enraged is a role-playing video game based on Filipino mythology and folklore developed by Anino Entertainment, an independent video game company based in the Manila, Philippines. It was released on November 22, 2003 for Microsoft Windows.

Anito: Defend a Land Enraged is the first video game that was produced and designed entirely by a team of Filipino game developers. The game also became a turning point that spawned the birth of game development industry in the Philippines.

Gameplay
The gameplay in Anito: Defend a Land Enraged is centered around combat and exploration. Players navigate the game's open-world environment using a combination of keyboard and mouse controls. They can engage in combat with various enemy types using a variety of weapons and abilities, including swords, shields, and ranged weapons. Players can also interact with non-playable characters (NPCs) and complete quests to progress through the story and unlock new abilities and equipment.

In addition to combat and exploration, Anito: Defend a Land Enraged features a variety of other gameplay elements, including puzzle-solving and resource management. Players must gather resources and craft items to survive and progress through the game, and they can also upgrade their character's abilities and equipment as they progress.

Plot
Anito is set in the 16th century on the island Maroka in Asia. Maroka is besieged both by internal conflict and armored invaders from a faraway place who are slowly turning the land into their monarch's colony. Datu Maktan – leader of the Mangatiwala tribe and the land's most influential peacemaker – mysteriously disappears, and it is up to his children Agila and Maya to find him and restore delicate peace that their father has kept in balance before conflicting forces tear the land apart.

Development
Anito is the first Filipino-made PC game. Its production started in October 2001. After two years of development, Philippine indie game developer Anino Entertainment launched its pioneering project, Anito: Defend A Land Enraged. The game was released in the US on November 20, 2003, and in Europe on November 20, 2003. It was made available in stores and for online purchase in the Philippines on November 22, 2003.

Development team

Reception and awards

Anito: Defend a Land Enraged has received average to negative reviews, with a score of 63 on Metacritic and 55.80% on GameRankings.

Anito won in the Innovation in Audio category at The 12th Annual Independent Games Festival in 2004.

References

2003 video games
Windows games
Windows-only games
Video games with isometric graphics
Video games developed in the Philippines
Philippine mythology in popular culture
Video games set in the 16th century
Single-player video games